George of the Palatinate (10 February 1486 – 27 September 1529) was Bishop of Speyer from 1513 to 1529.

Life 
His parents were Elector Palatine Philip and his wife Margaret of Bavaria-Landshut, a daughter of Duke Louis the Rich.

He held posts as canon in Mainz, Trier and Speyer and was Provost in Mainz from 1499 to 1506.  From 10 November 1502, he was also Dean of St. Donatian in Bruges.  Later, he was priest at Hochheim and Lorch.  On 12 February 1513, he became Bishop of Speyer.  He studied theology in Heidenberg in 1514  and received his Holy Orders on 10 July 1515.  On 22 July 1515, he was consecrated as bishop.

George sought to improvide discipline among the clergy in his diocese and forbade the study of the writings of Martin Luther.  However, he could not prevent his suffragan bishop Engelbrecht from converting to the new faith.  On 28 April 1523, he published his most memorable letter to his clergy, which states: 

Around Easter 1525, the German Peasants' War spread to the diocese of Speyer and rebellious peasants raided the bishop's cellars.  George fled to Heidelberg and the peasants occupied Kislau Castle, Rothenberg and Bruchsal Castle, set up a provisional government, invaded the Udenheim district and threatened Speyer itself.  On 29 April 1525, George met the rebels at Herrenalb and promised them they would be allowed to appoint a preacher of their choice.  He opened negotiations with the rebels at Philippsburg and signed an agreement with them on 5 May 1525.  The revolt was later struck down by forces from the Electoral Palatinate and other principalities.

George participated in the Diet of Speyer in 1529 and died on 27 September 1529 of the sweating sickness.  He was buried in the Speyer Cathedral.  The monument on his grave was destroyed by French troops in 1689, during the Nine Years' War.

Coat of arms 
The bishop's coat of arms is quartered in the usual way.  The fields of the shield alternately show the Wittelsbach family crest and the coat of arms of the Diocese of Speyer, a silver cross on a blue background.

Footnotes

References

External links 
 George of the Palatinate in the Saarländic Biographies

1486 births
1529 deaths
16th-century German Roman Catholic bishops
Roman Catholic bishops of Speyer
Princes of the Palatinate
House of Wittelsbach
Dukes in Bavaria
Deaths from sweating sickness
Sons of monarchs